A freedom movement is any organized effort within a society to promote, or attain, liberation or independence, based on social, political, economic, religious, or other ideological grounds.

The term freedom movement may refer to:

 Civil rights movement, in the United States
 Chicago Freedom Movement, an effort during the broader Civil Rights Movement, aimed at housing and economic rights for black residents of Chicago
 The modern libertarian effort to reduce government authority, particularly in the United States
 Health freedom movement or alternative medicine
 Indian independence movement
 Pakistan Movement
 Goa liberation movement, India

Organizations 
 Bahrain Freedom Movement, an Islamic group based in London
 Fascism and Freedom Movement, Italy
 Freedom Movement (New Zealand), a 1999 political party
 Freedom Movement of Iran
 Freedom Movement (Slovenia)
 Isatabu Freedom Movement, Guadalcanal
 Language Freedom Movement, Republic of Ireland
 Lakota Freedom Movement, American Indian Movement
 National Socialist Freedom Movement, Germany
 Palestinian Freedom Movement
 People's Freedom Movement (Jamaica)
 People's Freedom Movement (Serbia)
 Tavisupleba (political party), country of Georgia